The FIFA World Cup is an international association football competition contested by the men's national teams of the members of Fédération Internationale de Football Association (FIFA), the sport's global governing body. The championship has been awarded every four years since the first tournament in 1930, except in 1942 and 1946, due to World War II.

The tournament consists of two parts, the qualification phase and the final phase (officially called the World Cup Finals). The qualification phase, which currently take place over the three years preceding the Finals, is used to determine which teams qualify for the Finals. The current format of the Finals involves 32 teams competing for the title, at venues within the host nation (or nations) over a period of about a month. The World Cup Finals is the most widely viewed sporting event in the world, with an estimated 715.1 million people watching the 2006 tournament final.

The first time Denmark entered the tournament was for the 1958 edition in Sweden. However, they lost all four of their qualifying matches to England and the Republic of Ireland.

Denmark qualified for the first time in 1986, where they won all three of their group stage matches including a 2–0 victory against title contenders West Germany, but were eliminated by Spain in the next round. Since then, the Danish national team has regularly qualified for FIFA World Cup finals and made their sixth and most recent appearance at Qatar 2022. Their best performance was in 1998, where they reached the quarter-finals.

Summary table

*Draws include knockout matches decided via penalty shoot-out

Overview of matches

FIFA World Cup match records

1986 FIFA World Cup

Denmark made their first World Cup appearance in the 1986 World Cup, and with the attacking duo of Michael Laudrup and Preben Elkjær. In their first match against Scotland, Denmark won 1–0 with the only goal coming from Preben Elkjær after he burst into the penalty area before shooting left-footed low into the right corner of the net. The team surprised the world, sweeping the group, including a 6–1 thrashing of Uruguay. In the second round, Denmark faced Spain losing 5–1 on the strength of four Emilio Butragueño goals; the first Spain goal was caused by a miss-timed backpass by Jesper Olsen to Butragueño, an unfortunate action subsequently coined as "a real Jesper Olsen" ("en rigtig Jesper Olsen"). The phrase would live on for 13 years and was repeated by the Danish TV commentators in 1999, when an identical backpass was carried out by Jesper Grønkjær to Filippo Inzaghi on the former's debut for Denmark.

1998 FIFA World Cup
Under coach Bo "Bosse" Johansson, the 1998 FIFA World Cup saw the revival of the Danish team, starring both Laudrup brothers in their last international campaign. After beating Saudi Arabia 1–0, drawing with South Africa and losing 2–1 to later champions France in mediocre games, the Danish team qualified to the knockout stages as second in the group. In the next game however, Denmark played some of the best football of the entire tournament, beating Nigeria 4–1 in a fantastic game. In the quarterfinal against Brazil, the Danes went out with a beautiful 2–3 defeat to the later silver medalists, in a very close and emotional game.

2002 FIFA World Cup
Denmark qualified for the 2002 FIFA World Cup, but despite impressive results in the group stage, especially the 2–0 win against reigning World Cup winners France, Denmark didn't manage to advance any further as they were defeated with a 0–3 score in the round of 16 against England.

All times local (UTC+9)

2010 FIFA World Cup
At the 2010 World Cup, Denmark was grouped with Japan, Cameroon and the Netherlands. Denmark lost the first match 2–0 to Netherlands, but then had a vital 2–1 victory against Cameroon, which enabled further advancement in case of victory over Japan, the final match of the group stage. Denmark, however, lost 3–1, thereby failing to reach their goal of advancing to the round of 16 for the first time.

All times local (UTC+02)

Japan opened the scoring in the 17th minute from a direct free kick taken by Keisuke Honda – only the second goal scored from a free kick in the tournament. Honda, standing to Danish goalkeeper Thomas Sørensen's left, kicked the ball with great force; Sørensen initially moved to his left, and as the ball sailed past the wall, he shifted direction, but could not recover in time to make the save. Japan's second goal came thirteen minutes later, also from a direct free kick, this time by Yasuhito Endō. Standing outside the penalty area directly in front of the Danish goal, he curled the ball around the wall. Sørensen had been standing on the right side of his goal and could not move to his left fast enough. Endō almost scored from yet another free kick early in the second half. This time, Sørensen appeared to have difficulty judging the path of the ball, and was only able to palm it away at the last second, where it caromed off the goalpost.

Denmark needed to win this game in order to advance and increased their attacks accordingly. Late in the second half, Christian Eriksen put his shot over the goal and Søren Larsen hit the goalpost. They were finally able to score in the 82nd minute. When Makoto Hasebe was adjudged to have fouled Daniel Agger inside the penalty area, Denmark were awarded a penalty kick. Jon Dahl Tomasson took the shot, which was saved by Eiji Kawashima; the goalkeeper, however, was unable to control the rebound, which fell to Tomasson, and he was able to put it in the goal. Japan scored their final goal in the 87th minute. Honda dribbled into the penalty area, forcing Sørensen to attempt to block a potential shot, but Honda passed it to substitute Shinji Okazaki, who merely had to put the ball into an empty net.

The victory was Japan's second World Cup tournament victory on foreign soil, and only their second against a European team. Japan finished group play in second place with six points, and advanced to the knockout round for the second time in their history, and the first time on foreign soil. Denmark ended in third with three points. This was the first time Denmark failed to get past the group stage in the World Cup.

2018 FIFA World Cup

2022 FIFA World Cup

Record players

Top goalscorers

Awards and Records

Awards

 Bronze Ball 1986: Preben Elkjær

Records

 Longest gap between two goals by a player: Michael Laudrup (12 years and 16 days, 1986–1998)
 Fastest goal by a substitute: Ebbe Sand 1998 against Nigeria

References

External links
Denmark at FIFA
World Cup Finals Statistics

 
Countries at the FIFA World Cup